An electorate or electoral district is a geographical constituency used for electing a member to the New Zealand Parliament. The size of electorates is determined such that all electorates have approximately the same population.

Before 1996, all MPs were directly chosen for office by the voters of an electorate. In New Zealand's electoral system, 72 of the usually 120 seats in Parliament are filled by electorate members, with the remainder being filled from party lists in order to achieve proportional representation among parties. The 72 electorates are made up from 65 general and seven Māori electorates. The number of electorates increases periodically in line with national population growth; the number was increased from 71 to 72 starting at the 2020 general election.

Terminology
The Electoral Act 1993 refers to electorates as "electoral districts". Electorates are informally referred to as "seats", but technically the term seat refers to an elected member's place in Parliament.

Distribution
 the Representation Commission determines electorate boundaries. The Commission consists of:
 Four government officials—the Government Statistician, the Surveyor-General, the Chief Electoral Officer, and the Chairperson of the Local Government Commission.
 A representative of the governing party or coalition, and a representative of the opposition bloc.
 A chairperson (often a judge) nominated by the other members (with the exception of Chairperson of the Local Government Commission).

The Representation Commission reviews electorate boundaries after each New Zealand census, which normally occurs every five years. The South Island is guaranteed to have 16 general electorates, and dividing the number of persons in the South Island's general electoral population by 16 determines the South Island Quota which is then used to help calculate the number of Māori electorates and to determine the number of North Island electorates. The number of Māori electorates is influenced by the Māori Electoral Option where Māori voters can opt to be in either a Māori electorate or a general electorate. The percentage of Māori voters opting for the Māori roll determines the percentage of the whole Māori population (of persons claiming Māori ancestry at the previous census) which is then divided by the South Island Quota to calculate the number of Māori electorates. South Island Māori opting for the general roll are included in the population on which the South Island Quota is established. The North Island population (including Māori opting for the general roll) is divided into electorates, each of approximately the same population as the South Island ones. Electorates may vary by no more than 5% of the average population size. This has caused the number of list seats in Parliament to decline as the population is experiencing "northern drift" (i.e. the population of the North Island, especially around Auckland, is growing faster than that of the South Island) due both to internal migration and to immigration.

Although the New Zealand Parliament is intended to have 120 members, some terms have exceeded this quantity. Overhang seats arise when a party win more seats via electorates than their proportion of the party vote entitles them to; other parties are still awarded the same number of seats that they are entitled to, which results in more than 120 seats in total. In 2005 and 2011, 121 members were elected; 122 members were elected in 2008.

History 
Originally, electorates were drawn up by the Representation Commission based on political and social links, with little consideration for differences in population. Elections for the New Zealand House of Representatives in the 1850s modelled the electoral procedures used for the British House of Commons, which at that time featured both single-member electorates (electorates returning just one MP) and multi-member electorates (electorates returning more than one MP). Each electorate was allocated a different number of MPs (up to three) in order to balance population differences. All electorates used a plurality voting system. From 1881, a special country quota meant that rural seats could contain fewer people than urban seats, preserving improportionality by over-representing farmers. For the 1905 election the multi-member electorates were abolished. The quota system persisted until 1945.

Because of the increasing North Island population, the Representation Commission awarded the North Island an additional electoral seat beginning in the 2008 general election. Another new North Island seat was added for the 2014 general election, and again for the 2020 general election (with one new electorate in Auckland). Each time, the need for an additional seat was determined from the results of the most recent New Zealand census, with the seat coming out of the total number of list seats. The total number of list seats has thus declined from 55 to 48 since the introduction of mixed-member proportional voting in the 1996 general election.

Naming conventions
The Representation Commission determines the names of each electorate following the most recent census. An electorate may be named after a geographic region, landmark (e.g. a mountain) or main population area. The Commission adopts compass point names when there is not a more suitable name. The compass point reference usually follows the name of the main population centre, e.g. Hamilton East.

Special electorates

Over the years, there have been two types of "special" electorates created for particular communities. The first were special goldminers' electorates, created for participants in the Otago Goldrush—goldminers did not usually meet the residency and property requirements in the electorate they were prospecting in, but were numerous enough to warrant political representation. Two goldminers' electorates existed, the first began in 1863 and both ended in 1870.

Māori electorates 
Much more durable have been the Māori electorates, created in 1867 to give separate representation to Māori citizens. Although originally intended to be temporary, they came to function as reserved positions for Māori until 1967, ensuring that there would always be a Māori voice in Parliament. In 1967 the reserved status of the Maori seats was removed, allowing non-Maori to stand in the Maori electorates, thus removing any guarantee that Maori would be elected to Parliament. Until 1993 the number of Māori electorates was fixed at four, significantly under-representing Māori in Parliament. In 1975 the definition of who could opt to register on either the general or the māori roll was expanded to include all persons of Māori descent. Previously all persons of more than 50% Māori ancestry were on the Māori roll while persons of less than 50% Māori ancestry were required to enrol on the then European roll. Only persons presumed to have equal Māori and European ancestry (so-called half-castes) had a choice of roll. Since the introduction of MMP, the number of seats can change with the number of Māori voters who choose to go on the Māori roll rather than the general roll.

Electorates in the 53rd Parliament 

Electoral districts in the 2020 general election for the 53rd Parliament reflect changes made in the Representation Commission’s 2019/2020 boundary review. As well as new boundaries for many districts, the names of ten electorates have been changed, and one new electorate (Takanini) has been created. While some changes were made to the boundaries of the Māori electorates, their names and general area remain the same as in the 52nd Parliament.

General electorates

Māori electorates

Abolished electorates

General electorates
Electorates in New Zealand have changed extensively since 1853, typically to meet changing population distributions. Boundaries were last changed in 2019 and 2020 for the 2020 election, with Clutha-Southland, Dunedin North, Dunedin South, Helensville, Hunua, Manukau East, Port Hills and Rodney being abolished and replaced either by new electorates, or by surrounding electoral districts.

Māori electorates

Eastern Maori
Hauraki
Northern Maori
Southern Maori
Tainui
Te Puku O Te Whenua
Te Tai Rawhiti
Western Maori

Goldminers' electorates
Goldfields (1862–1870)
Gold Field Towns (1865–1870)
Westland Boroughs (1866–1870)

Explanatory note

References

External links
 Electoral profiles, produced by the Parliamentary Library, New Zealand Parliament.
 Map of electorates with boundaries, produced by the Parliamentary Library, run by the Electoral Commission, the Electoral Enrolment Centre, the Representation Commission, and the Justice Sector.

 
Electorates
New Zealand
Electorates